
The term soke (in Old English: , connected ultimately with , "to seek"), at the time of the Norman conquest of England, generally denoted "jurisdiction", but its vague usage makes it probably lack a single, precise definition.

Anglo-Saxon origins

According to many scholars, such as Frank Stenton and H. P. R. Finberg, "... the Danelaw was an especially ‘free’ area of Britain because the rank and file of the Danish armies, from whom sokemen were descended, had settled in the area and imported their own social system."

Royal grants of sac and soc are seen by historians like Paul Vinogradoff as opening the way for the replacement of national by local justice, through the creation of immunities or franchises: as  G. M. Trevelyan put it, “by grants of sac and soc   private justice was encroaching on public justice”. Other scholars have viewed the judicial powers represented by the Anglo-Saxon Soke as rather limited. The standard grant of sac et soc, toll et team et infangthief represented the equivalent of the authority of the reeve at the hundred court, impinging on royal justice, for instance, in the right to slay a thief caught red-handed (infangentheof).

Sokemen
A sokeman belonged to a class of tenants, found chiefly in the eastern counties, especially the Danelaw, occupying an intermediate position between the free tenants and the bond tenants, in that they owned and paid taxes on their land themselves. Forming between 30% and 50% of the countryside, they could buy and sell their land, but owed service to their lord's soke, court, or jurisdiction (though Adolphus Ballard argued that a sokeman was merely a man who rendered service from a sokeland, and was not necessarily under jurisdiction).

Sokemen remained an important rural element after the Conquest, buying and selling property, and providing their overlords with money rents and court attendance, rather than manorial labour.  According to the Ely Inquiry, the terms of remit for the Domesday Book specified determining for each manor “how many freemen; how many sokemen...and how much each freeman and sokeman had and has”.

Later developments
After the Norman Conquest, doubt developed over the precise meaning of the word soke.

Sometimes only the right to receive the fines and forfeitures of the men over whom it was granted when they had been condemned in a court of competent jurisdiction. The Leges also speaks of pleas  (‘pleas which are in his investigation’).

Ballard in the early twentieth century argued that the interpretation of the word "soke" as jurisdiction should be accepted only where it stands for the fuller phrase, "sake and soke", and that "soke" standing by itself denoted services. Certainly, many passages in the Domesday Book support this contention, but in other passages "soke" seems to serve merely as a short expression for "sake and soke".

Territorial

The term soke, unlike sake, sometimes applied to the district over which the right of jurisdiction extended (compare Soke of Peterborough).  By the same usage, it could designate the ward of a town, as with Aldgate in the charters of Henry I.

Legal terminology

See also
 History of English land law
 Soke used in place-names:
 Portsoken, a district in the City of London
 Soke of Peterborough, Cambridgeshire 
 Thorpe-le-Soken, Essex
 Kirby-le-Soken, Essex
 Walton-le-Soken, Essex
 Liberty of the Soke, Winchester
 Socken

References

External links
The Story of Our Law for Little Children (A simple history of the word Socage)

    
English legal terminology
Feudal duties
Former subdivisions of England
Land tenure
Legal history of England
Medieval English law